SkyWeek was a weekly astronomy television program created by Sky & Telescope magazine.  The show was hosted by Tony Flanders, associate editor of Sky & Telescope magazine. Each episode of the program was released in one, three, and five-minute formats; and, the show's content and format were similar to that of another weekly astronomy program called Star Gazers. SkyWeek was carried by many PBS affiliates.

Content 
SkyWeek was an educational program that described celestial events for the upcoming week. The show was aimed primarily at the general public and required no prior knowledge of astronomy. However, it also contained information that was likely to be interesting to experienced amateur astronomers. It depicted celestial objects in the night sky that could be seen without special equipment such as telescopes. Sky and Telescope's associate editor, Tony Flanders hosted the show, which was available in one-, three- and five-minute versions.

Production 
SkyWeek was produced by New Track Media, which publishes Sky & Telescope magazine. The show was distributed to PBS stations through American Public Television.

Images from the Hubble Space Telescope and many other professional and amateur sources were used in the production of the show.

On April 16, 2014, Tony Flanders announced that the episode covering the week of April 28 to May 4, 2014 would be the last for the series.  Flanders reported that the series was being discontinued because of insufficient money from sponsors required to cover the show's costs.

Episodes 
Episodes were titled by the week of the events they describe.  The production code used was of the form YYMMDD (2 digit year, 2 digit month, 2 digit day) for the date the episode was best suited to be broadcast.

Season 1: 2011 
The show premiered on November 19, 2011 with the inaugural episode covering the week of November 21 to 27 of 2011.

Season 2: 2012 
The 2012 season started on January 1, 2012.

Season 3: 2013 
The 2013 season started on January 1, 2013.

See also 
 The Sky Above Us, a television show on astronomy
 The Sky at Night, the longest running television show in the world
 Star Gazers, a weekly television show on astronomy
 StarDate (radio), a daily syndicated radio show highlighting upcoming celestial events
White House Astronomy Night

References

External links
 Official SkyWeek website
 Sky and Telescopes YouTube Channel

2011 American television series debuts
Astronomy education television series